Dancing with the Birds is a 2019 documentary film directed by Huw Cordey and narrated by Stephen Fry. The premise revolves around exotic birds doing mating rituals, such as dancing or creating bowers with the right decorations. Dancing with the Birds was released on October 23, 2019, on Netflix.

Featured birds 

 Black sicklebill
 Flame bowerbird
 Twelve-wired bird-of-paradise
 Carola's parotia
 King of Saxony bird-of-paradise
 MacGregor's bowerbird
 Guianan cock-of-the-rock
 Lance-tailed manakin
 Greater lophorina

References

External links

 
 

2019 documentary films
2019 films
American documentary television films
Netflix original documentary films
Films about birds
2010s English-language films
2010s American films